Otto Barth may refer to: 

Otto Barth (artist) (1876–1916), Austrian artist
Otto Barth (general) (1891–1963), German general in the Wehrmacht during World War II